Bluepoint Games Inc is an American video game developer based in Austin, Texas. Founded in 2006 by Andy O'Neil and Marco Thrush, the studio is known for video game remasters and remakes, such as Uncharted: The Nathan Drake Collection (2015), Shadow of the Colossus (2018), and Demon's Souls (2020). Sony Interactive Entertainment acquired Bluepoint Games in September 2021.

History 
Bluepoint Games was founded in 2006 by Andy O'Neil and Marco Thrush, two former Retro Studios employees who had worked on Metroid Prime. The studio's first game, Blast Factor, was released later that year. In August 2009, Sony Computer Entertainment announced that remastered versions of God of War and God of War II would be coming to the PlayStation 3 as God of War Collection. The ports were handled by Bluepoint and released on November 17, 2009, in North America. The studio's remasters of Ico and Shadow of the Colossus as The Ico & Shadow of the Colossus Collection for the PlayStation 3 were released in September 2011. Years later, in 2018, Bluepoint would remake Shadow of the Colossus for the PlayStation 4. The studio also handled the remastered HD versions of Metal Gear Solid 2: Substance and Metal Gear Solid 3: Subsistence included in the Metal Gear Solid HD Collection, which was released on November 8, 2011.

Bluepoint collaborated with SuperBot Entertainment to develop PlayStation All-Stars Battle Royale (2012), which was built on Bluepoint's proprietary engine. Bluepoint also ported the game to the PlayStation Vita. The studio collaborated with Santa Monica Studio to port Flower to the PlayStation 4 and PlayStation Vita in 2013, as well as with Respawn Entertainment to develop the Xbox 360 version of Titanfall (2014). After Titanfall, Bluepoint remastered the three PlayStation 3 releases of the Uncharted franchise to the PlayStation 4 as Uncharted: The Nathan Drake Collection, as well as Gravity Rush Remastered, which was released in Japan at the end of 2015 and internationally in early 2016.

O'Neil died in June 2019 aged 47. By August 2019, Bluepoint had hired several other former Retro Studios staff. Notable hires include designer Kynan Pearson in July 2013 and artist Elben Schafers in 2014. In June 2020, Bluepoint was announced as developing a remake of Demon's Souls. The remake was released as a launch title for PlayStation 5 in November 2020 and received universal acclaim from critics. Sony Interactive Entertainment (SIE) acquired Bluepoint on September 30, 2021, making it part of PlayStation Studios. SIE had previously leaked its intent to buy the studio in June that year. At the time, Bluepoint and its roughly 70 employees were working on original content.

Games developed

Support

References

External links 
 

2006 establishments in Texas
2021 mergers and acquisitions
American companies established in 2006
Companies based in Austin, Texas
PlayStation Studios
Video game companies based in Texas
Video game companies established in 2006
Video game development companies